Michael Joseph O'Farrell (December 2, 1832 – April 2, 1894) was an Irish-born prelate of the Roman Catholic Church who served as the first bishop of the Diocese of Trenton in New Jersey from 1881 until his death in 1894.

Biography

Early life 
Michael O'Farrell was born on December 2, 1832 in Limerick, Ireland.  He studied the classics and philosophy at All Hallows College in Dublin. He then went to France to study theology at the Seminary of Saint-Sulpice in Paris.

O'Farrell was ordained into the priesthood by Bishop John Ryan in Ireland on August 18, 1855.  He then  returned to Paris, where he joined the Society of Saint-Sulpice. After completing his novitiate, he was made professor of dogmatic theology. O'Farrell was sent by his superiors to teach at the Grand Seminary of Montreal in Montreal, Quebec. He also served as pastor of St. Patrick's Basilica in Montreal

O'Farrell eventually left the Sulpicians and moved to New York City, where he was incardinated, or transferred, into the Diocese of New York. He served as a curate at St. Peter's Parish in Manhattan until 1872, when he became pastor of St. Mary's Parish in Rondout, New York. After a brief tenure at St. Mary's, O'Farrell returned to St. Peter's in 1873 as its pastor.

Bishop of Trenton 
On August 11, 1881, O'Farrell was appointed the first bishop of the newly erected Diocese of Trenton by Pope Leo XIII. He received his episcopal consecration on November 1, 1881, from Cardinal John McCloskey, with Archbishop Michael Corrigan and Bishop John Loughlin serving as co-consecrators.

O'Farrell designated St. Mary's Church in Trenton as his cathedral. According to historian John Gilmary Shea, O'Farrell's efforts to establish institutions to develop religion in the southern part of New Jersey "...did not fail to excite hostility". St. John's Church, the oldest Catholic church in the diocese, burned down in 1883. During his tenure, O'Farrell erected several new parishes and missions, and established an orphanage in New Brunswick, New Jersey. and a home for the aged in Beverly, New Jersey.

O'Farrell also attended the Third Plenary Council of Baltimore in 1884. At the beginning of his tenure, the diocese contained 51 priests, 60 churches, and 24 parochial schools; by the time of his death, there were 92 priests, 101 churches, and 82 parochial schools.

Michael O'Farrell died in Trenton on April 2, 1894, at age 61.

References

1832 births
1894 deaths
Clergy from Limerick (city)
Irish emigrants to the United States (before 1923)
Seminary of Saint-Sulpice (France) alumni
Alumni of All Hallows College, Dublin
Irish expatriate Catholic bishops
19th-century Roman Catholic bishops in the United States
Roman Catholic bishops of Trenton